The Austrian Chess Championship is held by the Austrian Chess Federation (Österreichischer Schachbund).

For its correspondence chess subdivision, see OESB-FS.

Unofficial Championships
{| class="sortable wikitable"
! Year !! City !! Winner
|-
| 1921 || Vienna           || Fritz Sämisch
|-
| 1922 || Vienna           || Akiba Rubinstein
|-
| 1923 || Vienna           || Anton Schara
|-
| 1924 || Vienna           || Arthur Dünmann
|-
| 1925 || Vienna           || Albert Becker  Siegfried Reginald Wolf
|-
| 1926 || Vienna           || Siegmund Beutum
|}

Official Championships
Erich Eliskases won two matches for the title against Rudolf Spielmann in 1936 (5.5 : 4.5), and in 1937 (6 : 4), both in Semmering.
 
{| class="sortable wikitable"
! Year !! City !! Champion
|-
| 1929 || Innsbruck        || Erich Eliskases  Eduard Glass
|-
| 1930 || Graz             || Franz Kunert
|-
| 1931 || Bregenz          || Herbert Berghofer  Karl Palda
|-
| 1933 || Vienna           || Immo Fuss
|-
| 1934 || Vienna           || David Podhorzer
|-
| 1936 || Semmering *)     || Erich Eliskases
|-
| 1937 || Semmering *)     || Erich Eliskases
|-
| 1947 || Ischl            || Leopold Lenner
|-
| 1948 || Horn             || Karl Galia
|-
| 1949 || Eferding         || Josef Platt
|-
| 1950 || Melk             || Rudolf Palme
|-
| 1951 || Vienna           || Josef Lokvenc  Thaddäus Leinweber
|-
| 1952 || Steyr            || Karl Poschauko
|-
| 1953 || Wolfsberg        || Josef Lokvenc
|-
| 1954 || Baden bei Wien   || Andreas Dückstein
|-
| 1955 || Prein            || Franz Auer
|-
| 1956 || Prein            || Andreas Dückstein
|-
| 1957 || St. Johann in Tirol || Franz Auer
|-
| 1958 || /Hallein || Alexander Prameshuber
|-
| 1960 || Prein            || Karl Robatsch
|-
| 1963 || Ottenstein       || Wilhelm Schwarzbach
|-
| 1965 || Ottenstein       || Philipp Struner
|-
| 1967 || Graz             || Karl Janetschek
|-
| 1969 || Haag am Hausruck || Karl Röhrl
|-
| 1971 || Hartberg         || Karl Röhrl
|-
| 1973 || Loeben           || Karl Janetschek
|-
| 1975 || Mösern ob Telfs  || Franz Hölzl
|-
| 1977 || Mösern ob Telfs  || Andreas Dückstein
|-
| 1979 || Lienz            || Adolf Herzog
|-
| 1981 || Lienz            || Franz Hölzl
|-
| 1983 || Seckau           || Adolf Herzog
|-
| 1985 || Wolfsberg       || Josef Klinger
|-
| 1987 || Semriach         || Egon Brestian
|- 
| 1989 || Bad Schallerbach || Alexander Fauland 
|-
| 1991 || St. Lambrecht    || Reinhard Lendwai
|- 
| 1993 || Gamlitz         || Josef Klinger
|-
| 1994 || Leibnitz        || Alexander Fauland
|- 
| 1995 || Voitsberg       || Nikolaus Stanec 
|-
| 1996 || Leibnitz        || Nikolaus Stanec 
|-
| 1997 || Mösern          || Nikolaus Stanec
|- 
| 1998 || Tenneck/Werfen  || Nikolaus Stanec 
|-
| 1999 || Vienna          || Nikolaus Stanec 
|-
| 2000 || Frohnleiten     || Nikolaus Stanec 
|-
| 2001 || Mureck          || Siegfried Baumegger
|-
| 2002 || Oberpullendorf  || Nikolaus Stanec
|-
| 2003 || Hartberg       || Nikolaus Stanec
|-
| 2004 || Hartberg       || Nikolaus Stanec
|-
| 2005 || Gmunden       || Nikolaus Stanec
|-
| 2006 || Köflach       ||  Eva Moser
|-
| 2007 || Tweng        ||  Siegfried Baumegger
|-
| 2008 || Leoben       ||  Markus Ragger
|-
| 2009 || Jenbach      ||  Markus Ragger
|-
| 2010 || Vienna       ||  Markus Ragger
|-
| 2011 || Linz         ||  Georg Fröwis
|-
| 2012 || Zwettl       ||  David Shengelia
|-
| 2013 || Gisingen/Feldkirch || Peter Schreiner
|-
| 2014 || Feistritz an der Drau    || Mario Schachinger
|-
| 2015 || Pinkafeld       ||  David Shengelia
|-
| 2016|| St Johann im Pongau || Georg Fröwis
|-
| 2017|| Graz || Andreas Diermair
|-
| 2018 || Vienna  || Nikolaus Stanec
|-
| 2019|| Vienna || Nikolaus Stanec
|-
| 2020 || Graz  || Valentin Dragnev
|}

Official Championships (women)
{| class="sortable wikitable"
! Year !! City !! Champion
|-
|	1950	||	Melk	||	
|-
|	1951	||	Wien	||	
|-
|	1952	||	Graz	||	
|-
|	1953	||	Horn	||	
|-
|	1954	||	Pöchlarn	||	
|-
|	1955	||	Wien	||	
|-
|	1956	||	Judenburg	||	
|-
|	1958	||	Maria Anzbach	||	
|-
|	1960	||	Innsbruck	||	
|-
|	1964	||	Hartberg	||	
|-
|	1966	||	Mauerkirchen	||	
|-
|	1968	||	Kirchberg am Wechsel	||	
|-
|	1970	||	Seggau	||	  
|-
|	1972	||	Rohrbach ||	
|-
|	1974	||	Gloggnitz	||	
|-
|	1976	||	Krems	||	
|-
|	1978	||	Feldkirch	||	
|-
|	1980	||	Eggenburg	||	
|-
|	1982	||	Nüziders	||	
|-
|	1984	||	Kötschach-M.	||	
|-
|	1986	||	Kirchberg am Wechsel	||	
|-
|	1988	||	Lienz	||	
|-
|	1990	||	Braunau	||	
|-
|	1992	||	Neumarkt ||	
|-
|	1994	||	Grieskirchen	||	
|-
|	1996	||	Grieskirchen	||	
|-
|	1997	||	Gallspach	||	
|-
|	1998	||	Tenneck/Werfen	||	
|-
|	1999	||	Wien	||	
|-
|	2000	||	Frohnleiten	||	
|-
|	2001	||	Mureck	||	
|-
|	2002	||	Oberpullendorf	||	
|-
|	2003	||	Hartberg	||	
|-
|	2004	||	Hartberg	||	
|-
|	2005	||	Gmunden	||	
|-
|	2006	||	Köflach	||	  
|-
|	2007	||	Tweng	||	
|-
|	2008	||	Leoben	||	
|-
|	2009	||	Jenbach	||	
|-
|	2010	||	Vienna	||	Eva Moser
|-
|	2011	||	Linz	||	Eva Moser
|-
|	2012	||	Zwettl	||	Anna-Christina Kopinits
|-
|   2013    || Gisingen/Feldkirch || Veronika Exler
|-
|	2014	||	Feistritz an der Drau || Barbara Teuschler
|-
|	2015	||	Pinkafeld || Katharina Newrkla
|-
|	2016	||	St. Johann im Pongau || Anna-Lena Schnegg 
|-
|	2017	||	Graz || Anna-Christina Kopinits
|-
|  2018    ||  Vienna || Veronika Exler
|-
|	2019	||	Vienna || Regina Theissl-Pokorná
|-
|  2020    ||  Graz || Elisabeth Hapala
|}

References
 (results through 1985)
Staatsmeisterschaften der Herren
Die österreichischen Staatsmeister
2004 report with list of previous winners
2007 edition

Chess national championships
Women's chess national championships
Chess in Austria
Chess